Kristin Kinney McDonald (born August 27, 1959) is an American former professional tennis player.

Biography
Kinney grew up in Connecticut and attended Princeton University before turning professional. In addition to tennis she also excelled at squash while at Princeton, earning All-Ivy selection for both sports.

On the professional tour, Kinney reached a highest singles ranking of 117 in the world. Her best performance on the WTA Tour was a quarter-final appearance at the 1986 Northern California Open held in Berkeley. She made the third round of the 1986 Wimbledon Championships, before running into top seed Martina Navratilova.

References

External links
 
 

1959 births
Living people
American female tennis players
Tennis people from Connecticut
Princeton Tigers women's tennis players
American female squash players
Princeton Tigers women's squash players
20th-century American women